is a private junior college in Imabari, Ehime, Japan. The predecessor of the school, founded in 1906, was chartered as a women's junior college in 1966. In 1987 it became coeducational.

External links
 Official website 

Japanese junior colleges
Educational institutions established in 1906
Private universities and colleges in Japan
Universities and colleges in Ehime Prefecture
1906 establishments in Japan
Imabari, Ehime